is a 2013 Fuji TV Japanese soap opera, starring Honoka Miki and Yuki Furukawa in the lead roles. It aired from March 29, 2013, to July 19, 2013 with 16 episodes. In early October 2013, it was announced on the official website of Mischievous Kiss: Love in Tokyo that there is a green light for a second season. It was announced that a special titled Love in Okinawa would air on September 12, 2014. The second season began airing on November 24, 2014. Anime streaming service Crunchyroll acquired the streaming rights on January 6, 2014. It is based on the series of comics Itazura na Kiss.

Background
It is based on the manga Itazura Na Kiss written and illustrated by Tada Kaoru. The Japanese soap opera is the fifth television adaptation of the manga, following the Japanese live-action Itazura na Kiss in 1996, the Taiwanese It Started with a Kiss in 2005, its sequel They Kiss Again in 2007, Korean Playful Kiss in 2010, the Thai kiss me in 2015, and the Chinese Miss in Kiss in 2016.

Series storyline
Kotoko Aihara (Honoka Yahagi) isn't very intelligent and lacks ability in school. She is in class F, the least intelligent class in her grade. Despite this, she has been in love with the school's most handsome and most intelligent guy, Naoki Irie (Yuki Furukawa), ever since she saw him give a speech at the high school entrance ceremony.

In her third year of high school, she writes him a love letter but is rejected instantly. She is crushed to see her letter was not even looked at and decides to give up on the jerk who rejected her without even reading it. On the same day, Kotoko's house is hit by a shooting star and collapses. As it is being rebuilt, her dad gets a phone call from his longtime friend and is invited to stay with them. When she arrives, she is in shock to see that this is the house of Naoki Irie and his family. Although he shows a cold attitude, she realizes she can't help but love him. What will happen when fate takes over, and Kotoko's chance of winning Naoki's heart falls in her hands?

Cast

Main cast
 Honoka Yahagi as Kotoko Aihara

Kotoko Aihara is the protagonist. She has had a one-sided love for the school's most popular boy since her freshman year of high school. Though she is not good in academics, she works hard to succeed. She lives with her single father, with her mother having died when she was young. Due to an incident with their new house, Kotoko and her father are forced to move out and now live with the Irie family. Although Naoki and his younger brother are initially cold to her, she is openly welcomed by their parents — especially their mother, who develops an instant attachment to Kotoko due to always wanting a daughter. Throughout the first season, Kotoko feels as though Naoki hates her and is slow in realizing that he is actually falling in love with her. This is mainly due to Naoki giving her mixed signals of his feelings towards her, when he himself doesn't even understand them. Despite his indifference, Kotoko still works hard and tries her best to help Naoki and his family whenever she can. Kotoko is also close friends with Kinnosuke or 'Kin-chan' who openly expresses his love for her. However, she does not reciprocate his feelings and likes him as a close friend. Towards the season one finale, when Naoki is about marry Sahoko, she finally gives up on him and tries to move on with Kinnosuke. Despite her effort, she realizes that she is unable to ever let go of her love for Naoki. After this realization, Naoki soon admits his true feelings and proposes to her. This leaves her initially shocked, but she happily accepts.

 Yuki Furukawa as Naoki Irie

Naoki Irie is the smartest and most handsome boy at Tonan High School. He is rumored to have an IQ of 200 and is very popular among the girls due to his intelligence and good looks. He can be somewhat intimidating to other students at Tonan, particularly the bottom ranking class F, which Kotoko is a part of. Despite being loved by almost all the girls in his school, he has no interest in any of them. Initially, he is very cold and rather mean to Kotoko, leaving the impression that he dislikes her. However, he warms up to her as the story progresses and begins to fall in love with her. However, he fails to understand his feelings since he has never experienced such emotions before. Although he is an academic genius, he is very slow in terms of emotional intelligence and does not realize that he is in love with Kotoko. Because Naoki could do anything he set his mind to with ease, he had never experienced any sort of physical or mental hardship before meeting Kotoko. While he makes it clear that Kotoko frequently causes him trouble, he admits that she has also made his life more interesting. He later confesses how she has allowed him to finally experience basic human emotions (such as excitement and nervousness) for the first time. He experiences jealousy when he sees her with Kin-chan in season one, but is still unable to understand his feelings until hearing that Kin-chan proposed to her. Finally realizing and accepting his true feelings for Kotoko and knowing that he could truly lose her, he decides to make his feelings known and confesses to her. After this, he proposes to Kotoko and they get married. Later in the series, Naoki reveals that Kotoko was the reason he wanted to attend college and became a doctor (due to her suggesting that he would make an excellent one).

Supporting cast
 Yuki Yamada as Kinnosuke Ikezawa
Kinnosuke is Kotoko's good friend. He has a one-sided love for Kotoko and is willing to do anything for her. He is the only one in his class who was unable to go to college due to low scores. He was upset about this, but later cheered up when Kotoko told him that he can always find something he is good at; and not graduating means he can get a head start in the work field. This encourages him to work as a chef at her father's restaurant. He has a hatred for Naoki due to the way he treats Kotoko and his cold attitude toward her, but also because he knows that Kotoko loves him. He goes to great lengths to win Kotoko over, even after high school, in the hope that his unrequited feelings will eventually be reciprocated. He proposes to Kotoko when Naoki is due to marry Sahoko. He is rejected and painfully comes to terms that Kotoko cannot love him the way she loves Naoki. When Kotoko and Irie got married, he was forced to admit defeat. Despite this, he warned Naoki that if he ever breaks her heart, he will be there to wipe her tears.

 Nanami Fujimoto as Jinko Komori
Jinko is one of Kotoko's best friends. She usually wears headphones around her neck and, along with Satomi, she looks out for Kotoko and adores her. Jinko is very into music, supported by her equally musical boyfriend. She has a habit of telling people things that are supposedly meant to be kept secret — such as when she told Naoki's mother that he and Kotoko had kissed and when she told Naoki that Kin-chan had proposed to Kotoko. She is well aware of Kotoko's feelings for Naoki and despite being aware of his cold attitude toward her, supports her friend to pursue this love.

 Kasumi Yamaya as Satomi Ishikawa
Satomi is also Kotoko's best friend. She is a little more mature than the other two. She is interested in design and hopes to become successful in this field. She is level-headed but can be just as clueless as Jinko and Kotoko.

 Tomomi Nishimura as Noriko Irie
Noriko Irie, who is referred to as "Mama" by her husband, is the mother of Naoki and Yuuki. She loves Kotoko more than anyone because she has always wanted a daughter and treats Kotoko as her own from day one. She acts very young and can be somewhat immature. She is a lot younger than her husband and is very bubbly, energetic and positive. When she first found out Kotoko loved Irie, she was very happy and from there she would stop at nothing to make sure they end up together. She supports Kotoko in her endeavour to win Naoki's heart, aiming to foil anyone else's plans to get close to him. She can sometimes be seen as a bit controlling, in the sense that Naoki moved out because he wanted to live his own life and not one that his parents planned out for him. Despite this, she really loves her family and is ecstatic when Naoki confesses and proposes to Kotoko.

 Koura Kazumasa as Shigeki Irie
Referred to by Mama Irie as "Papa", Shigeki Irie is the father of Naoki and Yuuki, and also a longtime friend of Kotoko's father. He is a very jolly man, which surprises Kotoko because he looks and acts nothing like Naoki. He is hard working and is the head of a large company, which Naoki is supposed to take over in the future. He is somewhat controlling of Naoki's life, raising him to be his successor, though his son thinks differently. When he collapses due to health problems, Naoki takes over the company. It escalates to a point where he almost allows Naoki to marry the company partner's granddaughter to save the company. In the end, he supports Naoki's wishes to marry Kotoko instead (being fond of her cheerfulness) and allows Naoki to pursue his dream to become a doctor.

 Yuga Aizawa as Yuuki Irie
Yuuki is Naoki's younger brother. He takes after Naoki and looks up to him, which makes him act cold toward Kotoko when she first moves in. As an elementary school student, he is a genius and is smarter than Kotoko.

 Yoji Tanaka as Shigeru Aihara
Shigeru Aihara is the father of Kotoko. He works as a chef at his own restaurant named Aihara. He is good friends with Naoki's father. Mr. Aihara cares about his daughter very much and knows that Kotoko's love for Irie is one sided.

 Kanna Mori as Yuko Matsumoto
Yuko is one of Kotoko's rivals. She also likes Naoki. She is very good at tennis and convinces Naoki to join the tennis team with her. Yuko is very smart and beautiful but she chooses to go to a college that is below her standards is because she has been secretly fallen in love with Naoki when she was in high school.

 Riho Takada as Sahoko Oizumi
Sahoko is Naoki's fiancé near the end of the first season of the series who has been described by Naoki as "perfectly fit" for him. She also fells in love with him at first sight. Sahoko is very jealous of Kotoko because Naoki's mother incredibly loves Kotoko.

 Noémie Nakai as Christine Robbins
Christine, who appears in the second season of the series and is referred to as "Chris", is a foreign exchange student from England. She has a blonde hair and is fluent in both English and Japanese. Chris initially meets Kotoko at the university where Kotoko studies looking for directions and becomes friends with her. She also meets Kinnosuke and quickly falls in love with him when she, Kotoko, and Naoki, meets for dinner in Kotoko's father's restaurant. As Chris tries to convince Kinnosuke to accept her love, Kinnosuke also constantly denies, says that he is still secretly in love with Kotoko, despite she is already married with Naoki, and that he cannot accept anyone else's love, which turns down Chris's feelings. When Chris is about to board her flight back to England, Kinnosuke quickly runs to the airport and shouts out his love for her, which holds Chris's back to him. Chris later works at the university's cafeteria along with Kinnosuke and gently develops their mutual love.

Guest stars
 Aiko Sato as Nurse K. Irie

The actress who portrayed Kotoko Aihara in the original series that aired in 1996. She was seen in Episode 10, talking to Kotoko while recalling her memories when she was at their age.

 Takashi Kashiwabara as Doctor N. Irie

The actor who portrayed Naoki Irie in the original series that aired in 1996. He was seen in Episode 15.

References

External links
 Official site
 Fuji TV TWO official site
 Official Facebook page
 Official Twitter
 Itazura na Kiss: Love in Tokyo at the Internet Movie Database

Japanese drama television series
Japanese high school television series
Itazura na Kiss
2013 Japanese television series debuts
2013 Japanese television series endings
Fuji TV dramas
Television series about teenagers